Ton is a surname. Notable people with this surname.

Andreas Ton (born 1962),  Italian-born Swiss ice hockey player
John Ton (1826–1896), Dutch-born American abolitionist
Petr Ton (born 1973), Czech ice hockey player
Quinty Ton (born 1998), Dutch cyclist
Svatoslav Ton (born 1978), Czech high jumper
Tommy Ton (born 1984), Canadian fashion photographer

See also

Tôn, Vietnamese surname
Toon (name)